Jean Hamilton Walls (1885–1978)  was the first African American woman to enroll at the University of Pittsburgh and to receive a PhD from that institution, in 1938. She earned a bachelor's degree in physics and mathematics at the University of Pittsburgh in 1910, becoming the university's first black female graduate.

Early life and education 
Walls graduated from Allegheny High School in 1904. In 1910 she graduated from the University of Pittsburgh in physics and mathematics. She earned a master's degree from Howard University in 1912.

Teaching 
Dr. Walls was a teacher at the Frederick Douglass High School in Baltimore, Maryland, the Agricultural and Technical College in Greensboro, North Carolina and the Fort Valley School in Georgia.

YWCA 
She was the executive director of the Centre Avenue branch of the YWCA in Pittsburgh.

References 

1885 births
1978 deaths
University of Pittsburgh alumni
Howard University alumni